Leninsk-Kuznetsky District is an administrative district (raion), one of the nineteen in Kemerovo Oblast, Russia. As a municipal division, it is incorporated as Leninsk-Kuznetsky Municipal District. It is located in the west of the oblast. Its administrative center is the city of Leninsk-Kuznetsky (which is not administratively a part of the district). Population:  27,825 (2002 Census);

Administrative and municipal status
Within the framework of administrative divisions, Leninsk-Kuznetsky District is one of the nineteen in the oblast. The city of Leninsk-Kuznetsky serves as its administrative center, despite being incorporated separately as a city under oblast jurisdiction—an administrative unit with the status equal to that of the districts.

As a municipal division, the district is incorporated as Leninsk-Kuznetsky Municipal District. Leninsk-Kuznetsky City Under Oblast Jurisdiction is incorporated separately from the district as Leninsk-Kuznetsky Urban Okrug.

References

Notes

Sources

Districts of Kemerovo Oblast
